The discography of British born singer-songwriter and musician Jon Anderson.

Solo works

Studio albums

Production music
 Sunlight (2021)

Live albums
 Live from La La Land (2007)

Collection 
The Lost Tapes (2006–2008) (live performances, unreleased demo albums, etc.) (planned as a 20-CD boxset but only 7 CDs have been released as yet)
 Interview (2006) (JAVPBX01CD)
 The Mother's Day Concert (2006) (demos) (JAVPBX02CD)
 Searching For The Songs (2006) (demos) (JAVPBX03CD)
 Live in Sheffield 1980 (2006) (JAVPBX04CD)
 Watching The Flags That Fly (2006) (JAVPBX05CD) (Jon Anderson's personal demos, worked on in the south of France in 1990, for the never-officially released second ABWH studio album whose working title was Dialogue)
 The Lost Tapes of Opio (2007) (JAVPBX06CD)
 From Me To You (2008) (JAVPBX07CD)

Videos 
 Tour of the Universe (2005) (live DVD)

Singles 

Notes:

Collaborations

Pre Yes

The Warriors 
- Singles : 
 1964 : "You Came Along" / "Don't Make Me Blue" (7", Single)

- Album :
 2003 : Bolton Club 65 - Recorded live in 1965 and published on CD in 2003 on Voiceprint Label.

Yes 
Yes (1969)
Time and a Word (1970)
The Yes Album (1971)
Fragile (1971)
Close to the Edge (1972)
Yessongs (1973) (triple live album)
Tales from Topographic Oceans (1973) (double studio album)
Relayer (1974)
Yesterdays (1975) (studio compilation including rare cuts)
Going for the One (1977)
Tormato (1978)
Yesshows (1980) (double live album, originally intended as triple)
Classic Yes (1980) (studio compilation with two bonus unreleased live cuts)
90125 (1983)
9012Live: The Solos (1985) (live)
Big Generator (1987)
Union (1991)
Yesyears (1991) (quadruple CD compilation box set including rare and unreleased tracks)
Talk (1994)
Keys to Ascension (1996) (studio & live double CD album)
Keys to Ascension 2 (1997) (studio & live double CD album)
Something's Coming: The BBC Recordings 1969–1970 (1997; a.k.a. Astral Traveller)
Open Your Eyes (1997)
Yes, Friends and Relatives (1998) (double CD album compilation including remake of Owner of a Lonely Heart)
The Ladder (1999)
House of Yes: Live from House of Blues (2000) (double CD live album)
Magnification (2001)
In a Word: Yes (1969–) (2002) (quintuple CD compilation box set including rare and unreleased tracks)
The Ultimate Yes: 35th Anniversary Collection (2004) (U.S. triple CD album edition including unreleased acoustic versions)
The Word Is Live (2005) (triple CD live album)
Live at Montreux 2003 (2007) (double CD live album)
Union Live (2011) (double CD live album)
Progeny: Seven Shows from Seventy-Two (2015) (14-CD live box set)

Jon and Vangelis 
Studio albums 
Short Stories (1980)
The Friends of Mr Cairo (1981)
Private Collection (1983)
Page of Life (1991)
Page of Life (1998) (Alternate version not approved by Vangelis)

Compilations
The Best of Jon and Vangelis (1984)
Chronicles (1994)

Anderson, Harley & Batt 
Whatever You Believe (1988) (charity single)

Anderson Bruford Wakeman Howe 
Anderson Bruford Wakeman Howe (1989)
In The Big Dream - A Video Compilation (1989) (video)
An Evening of Yes Music Plus (1993) (double live album, recorded in 1989)
An Evening Of Yes Music Plus (1993) (video)
Live at the NEC (2012) (2CD + 1DVD live album, recorded in 1989)

Anderson/Wakeman 
The Living Tree (2010)
The Living Tree in Concert Part One (2011) (CD live album)

Jon Anderson & Matt Malley 
Family Circle (2014) (download only charity single)

Anderson-Ponty Band 
Better Late Than Never (2015) (CD/DVD live album)

Jon Anderson & Roine Stolt 
Invention of Knowledge (June 2016)

Yes Featuring Jon Anderson, Trevor Rabin, Rick Wakeman 
Live at the Apollo (2018) (2CD live album)

Guest appearances 
With Johnny Harris:
All To Bring You Morning (1969; 1973), on the track "All To Bring You Morning" (also featuring Steve Howe & Alan White)

With King Crimson:
Lizard (1970), vocals on the track "Prince Rupert Awakes"

With Colin Scot:
 Colin Scot (1971) Credited as "John Anderson (Dr Yes)" next to Rick "Broken Toes" Wakeman.

With Iron Butterfly:
Scorching Beauty (1974) co-writer on the track "Pearly Gates"

With Vangelis:
Heaven and Hell (1975), on the track "So Long Ago, So Clear"
Opéra Sauvage (1979), plays harp on the track "Flamants Roses"
See You Later (1980), on the tracks "Suffocation" and "See You Later"

With Alan White:
Ramshackled (1976), on the track "Spring - Song Of Innocence" (also featuring Steve Howe)

With Rick Wakeman:
1984 (1981), on the track "The Hymn"

With Mike Oldfield:
Crises (1983), on the track "In High Places"
"Shine (Extended Version)" Single (1986). Included on "The Platinum Collection" (2006)

Soundtracks:
Metropolis (1984), on the track "Cage Of Freedom"
St. Elmo's Fire (1985), on the track "This Time It Was Really Right" 
Biggles (1986), on the tracks "Do You Want To Be A Hero" and "Chocks Away"

With Tangerine Dream:
Legend Soundtrack (1985), on the track "Loved By the Sun"

With John Paul Jones):
Music From The Film "Scream For Help" (1985), on the tracks "Silver Train" and "Christie"

With Lawrence Gowan:
Great Dirty World (1987), on the track "Moonlight Desires"

With Toto:
The Seventh One (1988), on the track "Stop Loving You"

With Jonathan Elias:
Requiem For The Americas: Songs From The Lost World (1990), on the tracks "Within The Lost World" and "Far Far Cry"
Prayer Cycle: Path To Zero (2011), on the track "Devotion"

With Kitaro:
Dream (1992), on the tracks "Lady Of Dreams", "Agreement", "Dream Of Chant" and "Island Of Life"

With London Philharmonic Orchestra:
Symphonic Music of Yes (1993), on the tracks "Roundabout" and "I've Seen All Good People"

With Charlie Bisharat:
Along The Amazon (1993), on the track "Along The Amazon"

With Steve Bailey:
Evolution (1993), on the track "Evolution"

With Ayman: 
Dancing With My Soul (1994), on the track "Opionium"

With Milton Nascimento:
Angelus (1994), on the track "Estrelada"

With Tadamitsu Saito:
It's About Time (1995), on the tracks "Doshyamo", "Cascadia", and "It's About Time"

With Cielo Y Tierra: 
Heaven And Earth (1996), on the tracks "El Dia" and "La Segunda Oracion" - Mexican CD edition is self-titled and includes "La Segunda Oracion (Mountain High Remix" as a bonus track.

With Sir John Betjeman & Mike Read:
Words/Music (1998), on the track "Youth And Age" - Album re-released several times under different titles, including Centenary (2006) and "Sound Of Poetry" (2008).

With 4 Him:
Streams - Various Artists (1999), on the track: "The Only Thing I Need". Also on "The Best Of The 2000 Dove Awards" (2000)

With Steve Howe:
Portraits of Bob Dylan (1999), on the track "Sad Eyed Lady Of The Lowlands"

With Béla Fleck and the Flecktones: 
Outbound (2000), on the tracks "A Moment So Close" and "Aimun"

With Eduardo Del Signore:
Captivated (2001), keys on the tracks "Cocos Azules", "Captivated" & "Sight". wind controller on "Boabdil" and vocals on "Hope"

With Robert Downey, Jr.
The Futurist (2004), on the track "Your Move"

With Paul Green School Of Rock Music:
Rock School Soundtrack (2005), on the track "Heart Of The Sunrise"

With The Fellowship:
In Elven Lands (2006), on the tracks "Dan Barliman's Jig", "Eléchoi", "The Sacred Stones" and "Verses To Elbereth Gilthoniel"

With Dream Theater:
Systematic Chaos (2007), spoken word guest on a section of the track "Repentance"

With Glass Hammer:
Culture Of Ascent (2007), on the tracks "South Side Of The Sky" and "Life By Light"

With Alan Simon:
Excalibur II: L'Anneau des Celtes (The Celtic Ring) (2007), on the track "Circle Of Life"

With Fritz Heede:
Ritual Path (2007), on the track "Come By"

With Tommy Zvoncheck:
ZKG (2008), on the track "The Rain In Florida"

With Peter Machajdík:
Namah (2008), on the track "Sadness Of Flowing"
The Lynx Liaison (Návrat Rysov) (2010)

With Michael Mollura:
The Highest Pass Soundtrack (2011), on the tracks "The Highest Pass Title Song'" and "Waking Up"

With Marco Sabiu:
Audio Ergo Sum (2012), on the track "Limitless Lives"

With Dennis Haklar:
Lizard's Tale (2012), on the tracks "Leap Of Faith", "Prelude To Dawn", "Dawn Of An Era" and "Crossing Over"

With Jean Philippe Rykiel:
Inner Spaces (2012), on the track "Close To You"

With Jeff Pevar:
From The Core (2012), on the track "River Of Dreams"

With Wave Mechanics Union:
Further To Fly (2012), on the tracks "It Will Be A Good Day (The River)" and "Wonderous Stories"

With Everyday Animals:
Under The Tyranny Of Good Weather (2013), on the track "False Awakening"

With Todmobile:
Úlfur (2014), on the track "Wings Of Heaven" - Also includes a DVD of a live concert performing several Yes songs.

With The Spaces Between:
Let's Leave It At This For Now... (2014), on the track "Orchasm"

With Wanabi Farmeur:
Wanabi Farmeur (2014), on the track "Floating Stick"

With HuDost & Steve Kilbey:
The Word Is... (2015), on the track "OMEGA"

With Andrew Rubin:
Guitar Concerto (2016), co-writer, does not perform.

With Oakes & Smith:
Between The Earth And The Sky (2016), on the track "Closer To Home"

With Battles:
Juice B Crypts (2019), on the track "Sugar Foot" (also featuring Prairie WWWW)
With Trip the Witch:

 Trip the Witch (2021), on the track "Saturn We Miss You"

References

 Jon Anderson Pre-Yes discography : 
 The Warriors discography : https://www.discogs.com/artist/411488-The-Warriors-3
 Hans Christian Andersen Discography : https://www.discogs.com/artist/2029305-Hans-Christian-2

Discographies of British artists
Discographies of American artists